Zionsville Community School Corporation is a school district headquartered in Zionsville, Indiana. the largest town in Boone County, Indiana

Schools
Secondary:
 Zionsville Community High School
 Zionsville Middle School
 Zionsville West Middle School

Primary:
 Eagle Elementary School
 Pleasant View Elementary School
 Stonegate Elementary School
 Union Elementary School
 Boone Meadow Elementary School
 Trailside Elementary School (Opening 2022)

References

External links
 Zionsville Community School Corporation

Zionsville
Education in Boone County, Indiana